Coughton Court  is an English Tudor country house, situated on the main road between Studley and Alcester in Warwickshire. It is a Grade I listed building.

The house has a long crenellated façade directly facing the main road, at the centre of which is the Tudor Gatehouse, dating from after 1536; this has hexagonal turrets and oriel windows in the English Renaissance style. The Gatehouse is the oldest part of the house and is flanked by later wings, in the Strawberry Hill Gothic style, popularised by Horace Walpole.

History
The Coughton estate has been owned by the Throckmorton family since 1409. The estate was acquired through marriage to the De Spinney family. Coughton was rebuilt by Sir George Throckmorton, the first son of Sir Robert Throckmorton of Coughton Court by Catherine Marrow, daughter of William Marrow of London. The great gatehouse was dedicated to King Henry VIII by Throckmorton, a favourite of the King who spent most of his life rebuilding Coughton. Throckmorton would become notorious due to his almost fatal involvement in the divorce between King Henry and his first wife Catherine of Aragon. He  favoured the queen and was against the Reformation.  In 1549, when he was planning the windows in the great hall, he asked his son Nicholas to obtain from the heralds the correct tricking (colour abbreviations) of the arms of his ancestors' wives and his own cousin and niece by marriage Queen Catherine Parr (see gallery drawing). The costly recusancy (refusal to attend Anglican Church services) of his eldest son, Robert, and his heirs restricted later rebuilding, so that much of the house still stands largely as he left it.

After Throckmorton's death in 1552, Coughton passed to his eldest son, Robert. The family were practicing Catholics and so the house at one time contained a priest hole, possibly constructed by Nicholas Owen.  These were hiding places for priests during the period when Catholics were persecuted by law in England, from the beginning of the reign of Elizabeth I of England. The Hall also holds a place in English history for its roles in both the Throckmorton Plot of 1583 to murder Queen Elizabeth, and the Gunpowder Plot of 1605, although the Throckmorton family were themselves only indirectly implicated in the latter, when some of the Gunpowder conspirators rode directly there after its discovery.

The house has been in the ownership of the National Trust since 1946. The family, however, hold a 300-year lease and previously managed the property on behalf of the Trust. In 2007, however, the house reverted to management by the National Trust. The management of the property is renewed every 10 years. The family tenant was Clare McLaren-Throckmorton, known professionally as Clare Tritton QC, until she died on 31 October 2017.

The house, which is open to the public all year round, is set in extensive grounds including a walled formal garden, a river and a lake.

Architecture

The gatehouse at Coughton was built at the earliest in 1536, as it is built of stones which came from Bordesley Abbey and Evesham Abbey (both in Worcestershire) after the Dissolution of the Monasteries Act in 1536. As with other Tudor houses, it was built around a courtyard, with the gatehouse used for deliveries and coaches to travel through to the courtyard. The courtyard was closed on all four sides until 1651, when Parliamentary soldiers burnt the fourth (east) wing, along with many of the Throckmorton's family papers, during the English Civil War.

After the Roman Catholic Relief Act was passed in 1829, the Throckmorton family were able to afford large-scale building works, allowing them to remodel the west front.

In popular culture 
The house was used as a filming location for the BBC One series Father Brown in the episode The Mask of the Demon.

Gallery

See also
Hampton Court Palace
Throckmorton baronets

References

 
 Coughton Court (1979) Booklet for National Trust by J Lees-Milne.

External links
Official website
Coughton Court at nationaltrust.org.uk
Wikidata List of Paintings at Coughton Court

Country houses in Warwickshire
National Trust properties in Warwickshire
Grade I listed buildings in Warwickshire
Grade I listed houses
Historic house museums in Warwickshire

es:Coughton Court#top